This article a list of Progresso Associação do Sambizanga players. Progresso Associação do Sambizanga is an Angolan association football (soccer) club based in Luanda and plays at Estádio dos Coqueiros.  The club was established in 1975.

2020–2021
Progresso Associação do Sambizanga players 2020–2021

2011–2020
Progresso Associação do Sambizanga players 2011–2020

2001–2010
Progresso Associação do Sambizanga players 2001–2010

1991–2000
Progresso Associação do Sambizanga players 1991–2000

1982–1990
Progresso Associação do Sambizanga players 1982–1990

External links
 Girabola.com profile
 Zerozero.pt profile
 Match details

References

Progresso Associação do Sambizanga
Progresso Associação do Sambizanga players
Association football player non-biographical articles